Vincent Brady (14 March 1936 – 6 October 2020) was an Irish Fianna Fáil politician. He served under Taoiseach Charles Haughey as Government Chief Whip (1987–1991) and Minister for Defence (1991–1992).

Early life
Brady was born in Dublin on 14 March 1936. His parents, Tom and Nellie Gilroy, were a young couple from County Cavan. As they were not married at the time, they placed Vincent in foster care. He was fostered by Margaret Bourke, a widow from County Kilkenny, and her two sisters. They lived on Tolka Road in Ballybough. Until 1998, Brady was unaware that he had nine younger siblings. He met his birth family at the age of 62. He was educated at St Canice's CBS and O'Connell School in Dublin, before studying accounting and business at the College of Commerce in Rathmines. Before embarking on a career in politics, he was a director of a company engaged in machinery distribution, which he had founded in 1970.

Political career
Brady was elected to Dáil Éireann at his first attempt, in the 1977 general election for the Dublin North-Central constituency. Two years later he became involved in local politics, when he was elected to Dublin City Council.

When in 1979 Fianna Fáil faced its first leadership election since 1966, Brady backed his constituency colleague Charles Haughey against the only other contender, George Colley. Haughey won, and Brady continued to back him during the three attempts in the early 1980s to displace Haughey from the party leadership.

During the early 1980s, Brady was a member of the Council of Europe. In 1984 he joined the front bench of the party as Chief Whip. He was re-elected to Dublin City Council in 1985, having topped the poll in Dublin Clontarf and received the highest vote in the country. When Fianna Fáil returned to government in 1987, Brady was appointed Minister of State at the Department of the Taoiseach and Defence, the Government Chief Whip. He served in that position until November 1991, when he joined the cabinet as Minister for Defence. He remained in that position until February 1992, when Albert Reynolds became Taoiseach and sacked Brady, along with many other senior ministers who had served under Haughey. Brady retired from politics at the 1992 general election. After his retirement from politics, he concentrated on continuing the development of his distribution business.

Personal life
Brady married Mary Neville, known as Mollie, and they had three children. Vincent and Mollie were later estranged. He began a relationship with Dymphna O’Moore who was his partner until his death on 6 October 2020. Brady's estate was valued at €31,191,408. He bequeathed property and shares to Mollie, Dymphna, his children, and his grandchildren. He left €10,000 to his foster siblings. He also left €5,000 to the Society of Saint Vincent de Paul with an “express wish” that the money be used in Marino, Dublin, “insofar as possible”.

References

 

1936 births
2020 deaths
Fianna Fáil TDs
Local councillors in Dublin (city)
Members of the 21st Dáil
Members of the 22nd Dáil
Members of the 23rd Dáil
Members of the 24th Dáil
Members of the 25th Dáil
Members of the 26th Dáil
Politicians from County Dublin
Ministers for Defence (Ireland)
Ministers of State of the 26th Dáil
Ministers of State of the 25th Dáil
Alumni of Dublin Institute of Technology
Government Chief Whip (Ireland)